The 1931 Simmons Cowboys football team represented Simmons University—now known as Hardin–Simmons University—as a member of the Texas Conference during 1931 college football season.

Schedule

References

Simmons
Hardin–Simmons Cowboys football seasons
Simmons Cowboys football